Club Fotbal Rîșcani is a Moldovan football club based in Rîșcani, Moldova. They play in the Divizia B, the third tier of Moldovan football.

Achievements
Divizia B
 Winners (1): 2012–13

External links
Official website
CF Rîșcani on Soccerway.com

Football clubs in Moldova
Association football clubs established in 2008
CF Riscani